The Neon Skyline is the sixth studio album by Canadian musician Andy Shauf. It was released on January 24, 2020 under Anti-.

A tour in support of the album was scheduled for February 2020, but was postponed to August 2020 due to the COVID-19 pandemic.

President Barack Obama featured the title track, Neon Skyline, on his 2020 summer playlist. Commenting on this honor, Shauf stated, "It’s cool to think that Obama, or the Obamas together, have listened to my music. It’s a really nice feeling to think my music has gone that far."

Critical reception
The Neon Skyline was met with universal acclaim reviews from critics. At Metacritic, which assigns a weighted average rating out of 100 to reviews from mainstream publications, this release received an average score of 81, based on 12 reviews.

Accolades

Track listing

Charts

References

2020 albums
Anti- (record label) albums